Philippa Gail (1942–1999) was a British theatre, film and television actress. The Guardian called her "An actress of power and passion who mingled sex appeal with forthright emotion."

She trained at Webber-Douglas, where she won the award for best actress. There followed stage work including Shakespeare, Shaw and Ostrovsky. In the West End she was Maria in Twelfth Night, and the General's daughter in Anouilh's The Fighting Cock at the Duke of York's. At the Assembly Rooms in York, her performance in Ibsen's Little Eyolf was described by critics as "genuinely revelatory."

In 1970 she married David Conville, director of the Open Air Theatre, Regents Park, where she made many of her later stage appearances.

Interspersed amongst her stage work were film and TV parts, including starring as the seductive Jane in The Troubleshooters, This Is My Street,  Man in a Suitcase, the title role in William Douglas Home's The Reluctant Debutante (ITV Play of the Week), Giants On Saturday, Triangle, Brett, Coronation Street, The Sweeney and the Ruth Rendell thriller A Fatal Inversion.

Gail also taught drama at the Eugene O'Neill Centre and South Florida University, and continued to appear on stage before retiring in 1996.

She died of cancer in 1999, and was survived by her husband David and their son.

Filmography

Film

Television

References

External links
 
 Philippa Gail Obituary in The Guardian

1942 births
1999 deaths
English stage actresses
English film actresses
English television actresses
People from Bishop's Stortford
Actresses from Hertfordshire
20th-century English actresses